The 1987 World Series of Poker (WSOP) was a series of poker tournaments held at Binion's Horseshoe.

Preliminary events

Main Event

There were 152 entrants to the main event. Each paid $10,000 to enter the tournament. The 1987 Main Event was Johnny Chan's first of back-to-back World Championships.

Final table

Other High Finishes

NB: This list is restricted to top 30 finishers with an existing Wikipedia entry.

Notes

World Series of Poker
World Series of Poker